Zach Fishwick is a professional rugby league footballer who plays as a  for Hull Kingston Rovers in the Betfred Super League.

In 2022 he made his Hull KR début in the Super League against Hull F.C.

References

2005 births
Living people
English rugby league players
Hull Kingston Rovers players
Rugby league props